Lea Birch (17 January 1798 – 13 June 1868) was an English first-class cricketer.

Birch was born in January 1798 at Cartmel, Lancashire. He played first-class cricket on two occasions for Manchester, with both matches coming against Yorkshire in 1844 and 1845 at Moss Lane. He scored 26 runs with a high score of 11 across his two appearances, in addition to taking 8 wickets with best figures of 4 for 40. He married Amy Downward in 1823, with the couple having three sons. Their son, Scholes, also played first-class cricket. Birch died in June 1868 at Totnes, Devon.

References

External links

1798 births
1868 deaths
People from Cartmel
English cricketers
Manchester Cricket Club cricketers